Kurunegala Railway Station is a major station, situated in the Kurunegala District, North Western Province, Sri Lanka.

The station serves as a terminus for several trains, with all trains running on the Northern Line, Trincomalee Line, and Batticaloa Line, stopping at the station, however a number of Intercity express trains do not stop at the station. The station has a one platform with several passing loops or sidings and a crossing loop to facilitate the switching of terminating trains.

History 
The Jaffna Railway Commission report published in 1891 recommended the construction of a new railway line (now known as the northern line) from Polgahawela to Kurunegala and a survey of a line to Jaffna. The line would join the Main Line at Polgahawela Junction, allowing trains to run to the capital, Colombo. Approval to construct the line was granted in 1892 and the new line to Kurunegala officially opened on 14 February 1894 by Governor Sir Arthur Elibank Havelock. Construction of the rest of Northern Line continued, and on 1 August 1905, the first train from Colombo arrived at Jaffna Railway Station.

Continuity

Timetable

See also
 List of railway stations in Sri Lanka
 List of railway stations by line order in Sri Lanka

References

Railway stations in Kurunegala District
Railway stations on the Northern Line (Sri Lanka)
Railway stations on the Main Line (Sri Lanka)
Railway stations opened in 1866